The Grand Morin (literally Great Morin) is a  long river in France, left tributary of the Marne. Its source is near the village of Lachy. Its course crosses the departments of Marne and Seine-et-Marne. It flows westwards through the towns of Esternay, La Ferté-Gaucher, Coulommiers and Crécy-la-Chapelle, finally flowing into the Marne in Esbly.

Its main tributary is the Aubetin.

References

Rivers of France
Rivers of Marne (department)
Rivers of Seine-et-Marne
Rivers of Grand Est
Rivers of Île-de-France